= Autovía A-375 =

Highway in Spain

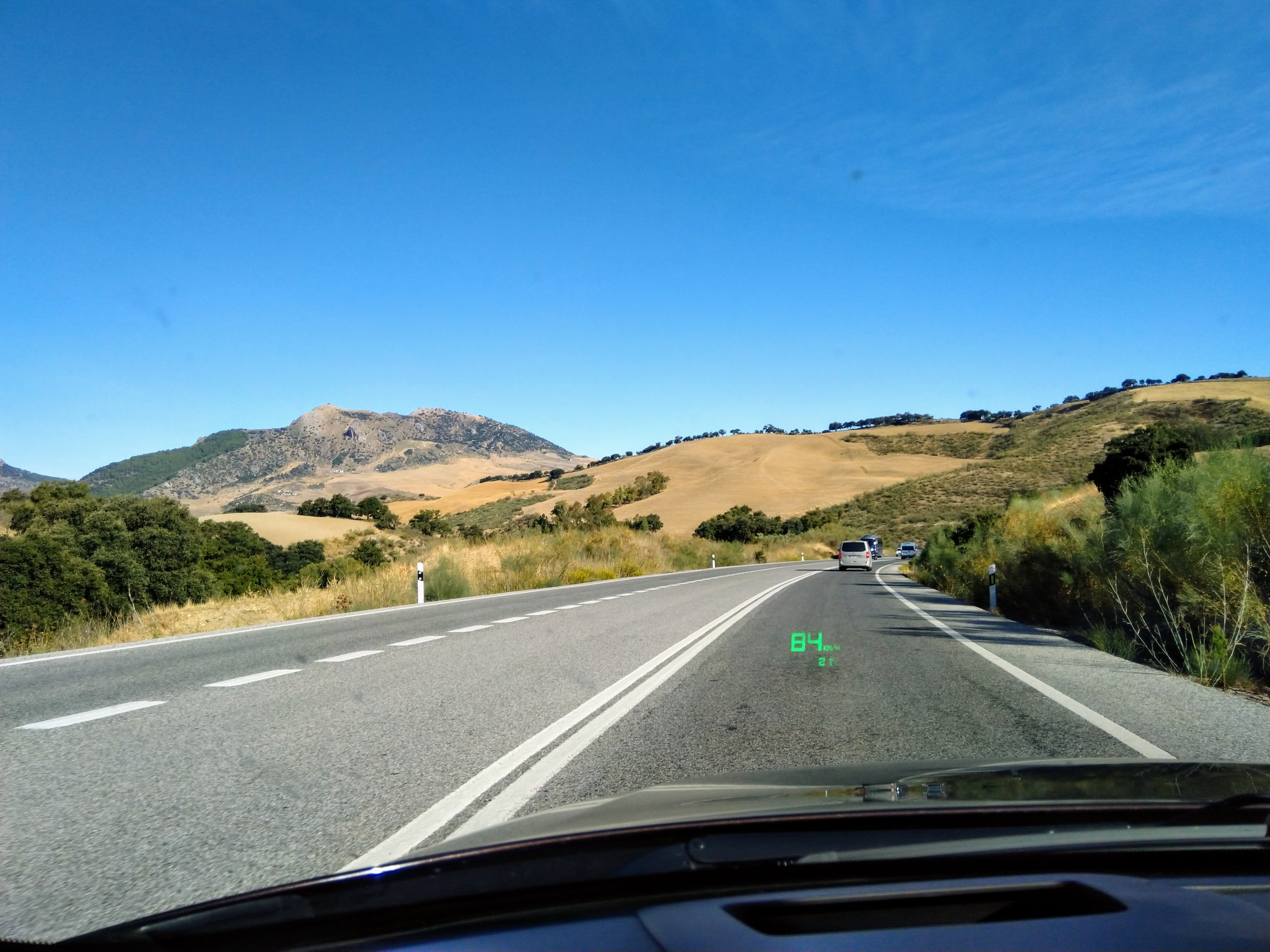
Autovia

The Autovía A-375 is a highway in Spain. It passes through Andalusia.
